Roar Uthaug (born August 25, 1973) is a Norwegian film director. He graduated from the Norwegian Film School in 2002.

Career 
Uthaug's graduation film The Martin Administration was the second Norwegian student-film in history to be nominated by AMPAS (the Academy of Motion Pictures, Arts and Science) for the Student Academy Awards.

Working at the Norwegian production company Fantefilm, Uthaug has directed numerous commercials for Norwegian TV, and music videos for Gåte, Furia, Unni Wilhelmsen and Vidar Busk.

His feature debut Fritt Vilt (Cold Prey) was released in Norway on October 13, 2006. His notable feature was the 2015 disaster film, The Wave. In 2018, Uthaug directed Tomb Raider, the reboot of the film franchise, which was released on March 16, 2018 starring Alicia Vikander as Lara Croft. In 2022, he directed the film, Troll. It was released on Netflix on December 1, 2022.

Filmography

References

External links 
 
 Fritt Vilt

1973 births
Television commercial directors
Living people
Norwegian music video directors
Norwegian film directors